The black manakin (Xenopipo atronitens) is a species of bird in the family Pipridae. It is found in Bolivia, Brazil, Colombia, French Guiana, Guyana, Peru, Suriname, and Venezuela.

Its natural habitats are subtropical or tropical moist lowland forest and subtropical or tropical dry shrubland.

References

black manakin
Birds of the Guianas
Birds of the Amazon Basin
Birds of the Colombian Amazon
Birds of the Venezuelan Amazon
black manakin
Taxonomy articles created by Polbot